or Judo therapy (柔道整復術) is the traditional Japanese art of bone-setting. It has been used in many Japanese martial arts and has developed alongside Judo (柔道) into a licensed medical practice somewhat resembling chiropractic in Japan today.

See also
Anma and shiatsu
Dit Da
Tui na

External links

Traditional Japanese medicine
Alternative medicine
Asian traditional medicine
Judo